Dental Council may refer to:

 Dental Council of India, a 1948 establishment
 General Dental Council, a United Kingdom organisation which regulates all dental professionals in the country
 Orthodontic Technicians Association Council, the governing body of the Orthodontic Technicians Association
 Pakistan Medical and Dental Council, a Pakistan federal department